Antecubital refers to something that is positioned anteriorly to the elbow (Latin cubitus), such as:
Antecubital fossa
Antecubital vein